Miss Universe Puerto Rico is a national beauty pageant in Puerto Rico, held annually since 1952. Currently, the pageant is responsible for selecting the country’s delegates to Miss Universe. Since 2018, the organization is owned by Hemisphere Media Group, and the annual competition is broadcast on WAPA TV and WAPA América. After Hemisphere Media Group acquired the rights of the franchise, Denise Quiñones, was appointed as the director of the organization.

Traditionally, the organization begins castings of the contestants in April. The delegates of each municipality go through months of training and workshops. The pageant's preliminary and final night are held in September. The winner of the title of Miss Puerto Rico Universe goes to compete in Miss Universe, traditionally held in December.

History

The selection of Miss Puerto Rico commences the year before the winner advances to participate in the Miss Universe pageant. Each Puerto Rican city may choose a representative who then enters the Miss Puerto Rico finals, traditionally held at a San Juan area hotel. The winner is crowned at the conclusion of the final competition.

There have been three changes in the organization that led to modifications in the pageant's name. "Miss Puerto Rico" was held from 1952 until 1998 under the direction of Anna Santisteban, in 1996 the pageant lost the franchise for Miss Universe. From 1996 to 1998 Telemundo organized the event, under the name "Miss Universe Puerto Rico". From 1999 to 2002 TeleOnce (now Univision Puerto Rico) obtained the franchise and renamed it "Miss Puerto Rico Universe". Magali Febles organized the pageant between 2003 and 2009 and the pageant title has remained the same. In 2009, Luisito Vigoreaux and Desireé Lowry obtained the Miss Universe franchise and renamed the pageant "Miss Universe Puerto Rico".

The Miss Puerto Rico beauty pageant has now turned to technology to reach more people through the use of podcasting. Starting with the 2006 pageant, Miss Puerto Rico Universe became the first pageant of the Miss Universe franchise to have a podcast. In this, Wilton Vargas, an international multi-media and technology personality, interviews all contestants with the goal of helping people get to know them better so that they can participate in the voting process using cell phones. This podcast is published as a section in technology news and information website Tecnetico.com and various podcast directories, including iTunes.

Delegates are allowed to compete more than once at the Miss Puerto Rico Universe pageant, the caveat being that they are not allowed to compete again after they have won. For example, Cynthia Olavarría placed 1st runner-up in 2003 and returned in 2005, winning the title and placing 1st runner-up at Miss Universe. A number of delegates and winners have competed in the "Miss Mundo de Puerto Rico" (Miss World Puerto Rico) pageant, a preliminary to the Miss World pageant. There are frequently crossovers between the two pageants: for example Joyce Giraud was crowned Miss Puerto Rico twice by Ana Rosa Brito, first in 1994 as Miss Mundo de Puerto Rico, then in 1998 as Miss Universe Puerto Rico.

Puerto Rico is one of the most successful competitors in the history of the Miss Universe pageant, having won five times. Marisol Malaret, Miss Puerto Rico 1970, was the first Puerto Rican to win the Miss Universe title. The four other Puerto Rican delegates who have won the Miss Universe title are Deborah Carthy-Deu (1985), Dayanara Torres (1993), Denise Quiñones (2001), and Zuleyka Rivera (2006).

On November 7, 2011, Miss Universe Puerto Rico selected the first woman who was not born in Puerto Rico to represent the island at Miss Universe 2012. Bodine Koehler Peña was crowned as Miss Universe Puerto Rico 2012. Koehler was born in the Netherlands to a Dutch father and a Dominican mother, and grew up in Puerto Rico.

On February 5, 2018, it was announced that Luisito Vigoreaux and Desiree Lowry had lost the rights to the franchise, with WME/IMG awarding rights to WAPA-TV.

On February 15, 2018, Miss Puerto Rico Universe 2001 and Miss Universe 2001 winner Denise Quiñones was named as the pageant's national director.

Controversy

Nationality of contestants
In 2011, after Bodine Koehler Peña was crowned Miss Universe Puerto Rico 2012, people started to question her nationality. Koehler Peña was born in the Netherlands, her father is Dutch and her mother is Dominican. Regarding the criticism, Koehler Peña said: "I want to clarify a point about my nationality and that is that I am Puerto Rican and I feel very proud to represent Puerto Rico. I was born in the Netherlands, but I came here when I was very little and my family is here too." After the strong criticism, the national director of the pageant at that time, Desiree Lowry, explained that the rules of the contest establish that the participants must be citizens of the country and have lived in it for a minimum of six months.

Titleholders
Representatives of Puerto Rico in the Miss Universe pageant.
Key

Miss Universe Puerto Rico
In 2009, Luisito Vigoreaux and Desireé Lowry obtained the Miss Universe franchise and renamed the pageant "Miss Universe Puerto Rico". Since 2018, the organization is owned by Hemisphere Media Group, and the annual competition is broadcast on WAPA TV and WAPA América. After Hemisphere Media Group acquired the rights of the franchise, Denise Quiñones, was appointed as the organization's director. In 2022, Yizette Cifredo became the organization's national director.

Miss Puerto Rico Universe
From 1999 to 2002 TeleOnce (now Univision Puerto Rico) obtained the franchise and renamed it "Miss Puerto Rico Universe". Magali Febles organized the pageant between 2003 and 2009 and the pageant title has remained the same.

Miss Puerto Rico
Miss Puerto Rico was held from 1952 until 1998 under the direction of Anna Santisteban.

Statistic rankings

Placements at Miss Universe

Cities with most titleholders

Gallery of winners

See also

Miss Puerto Rico

Notes

References

External links
 Miss Universe Puerto Rico
 El Podcast de Miss Puerto Rico Universe
 Miss Universe

Puerto Rico
Beauty pageants in Puerto Rico